Alejandro Selkirk Island, previously known as Más Afuera (Farther Out (to Sea)) and renamed after the marooned sailor Alexander Selkirk, is the largest and most westerly island in the Juan Fernández Archipelago of the Valparaíso Region of Chile.

The Archipelago was home to the marooned sailor Alexander Selkirk from 1704 to 1709, and is thought to have inspired novelist Daniel Defoe's fictional Robinson Crusoe in his 1719 novel about the character (although the novel is explicitly set in the Caribbean, not in the Juan Fernández Islands). This was just one of several survival stories from the period that Defoe would have been aware of. To reflect the literary lore associated with the island and attract tourists, the Chilean government renamed the place Alejandro Selkirk Island in 1966.

Geography 

 

It is densely wooded and very mountainous and is marked by ridges and numerous deep ravines lead to a steep, rugged coast on the east side of the island off which are tremendous depths.

Landing is possible near the center of the east shore at Quebrada Sánchez (Sánchez Ravine), and at the foot of Quebrada Las Casas (La Casas Ravine) ), where there is a boat slip and buildings of the former penal colony. The ravine is recognized by a white patch on a hill near it.

Alejandro Selkirk Island is the emergent summit of a submarine shield volcano that formed during the Pleistocene epoch. Dating of rocks on the island show that it is the youngest of the Juan Fernández Islands at an age of 1 – 2 million years old. Due to its young age, the island shows little evidence of erosion. Podesta Island, once reported to lie farther to the west, is a phantom island.

Climate
Alejandro Selkirk has a subtropical climate, moderated by the cold Humboldt Current and the southeast trade winds. Higher elevations are generally cooler. Rainfall is higher in the winter months, and varies with elevation and exposure; elevations above  experience almost daily rainfall.

Flora and fauna 
The Juan Fernández fur seal is known to have existed during the late 17th century on the island with the population of the seals on Alejandro Selkirk Island and Robinson Crusoe Island believed to be in excess of four million by the late 17th century. A census of 1797 estimated a population 2 – 3 million fur seals. The species was hunted to near extinction by the 19th century and was thought to be extinct for 100 years until 200 were found on the island in 1965. Since then, the population has grown steadily at 15% to 20% every year. The Masafuera rayadito is endemic to Alejandro Selkirk and one of the rarest South American birds with only 140 individuals left. The Alejandro Selkirk firecrown, Sephanoides fernandensis leyboldi, an endemic subspecies of the Juan Fernández firecrown, became extinct in 1908 due to feral goats and other introduced animals. The island has been recognised as an Important Bird Area (IBA) by BirdLife International because it supports populations of Stejneger's and Juan Fernandez petrels, as well as the Masafuera rayaditos.

The flora on the island is in the Fernandezian Region Floristic Region,  in the Antarctic Floristic Kingdom, but often also included within the Neotropical Kingdom.  Endemic plant families include Lactoridaceae, with endemic plant genera also found.

History 
Throughout much of its history, the island has been uninhabited. About 20 buildings can be made out on detailed satellite images. The settlement was operative from 1909. It initially housed 190 criminals, while there were as many as 160 political prisoners from 1927 to 1930. The penal colony was abandoned in 1930. Recently, the island has seen regular settlement, with 57 people living on the island as of the 2012 census.

In 1966 the Chilean government renamed Isla Más Afuera as Alejandro Selkirk Island, with Isla Más a Tierra becoming Robinson Crusoe Island. Alexander Selkirk was a Scottish sailor who was marooned as a castaway on Más a Tierra (then uninhabited) from 1704 to 1709. His story of survival likely inspired the 1719 novel Robinson Crusoe by Daniel Defoe.

See also
Flora of the Juan Fernández Islands
Endemic flora of the Juan Fernández Islands
Endemic fauna of the Juan Fernández Islands

References

External links

 Robinson Crusoe, Moai statues and the Rapa Nui: the stories of Chile’s far-off islands
Geographical names on Alejandro Selkirk Island
Patagonia documentary about the island, Los Plastico

 
Islands of Valparaíso Region
Juan Fernández Islands
Polygenetic shield volcanoes
Pleistocene shield volcanoes
Important Bird Areas of the Juan Fernández Islands
Seabird colonies